Terry Michael Ratzmann (April 29, 1960 – March 12, 2005) was an American mass murderer who killed seven members of his Church congregation,  the Living Church of God (LCG), before committing suicide in Brookfield, Wisconsin in 2005.

Background 
Previously living with his mother and sister, Ratzmann was known as an avid gardener who often shared his homegrown produce with the church congregation and had a passion for carnivorous plants.  He was a computer technician with a placement firm and his contract was ending. Ratzmann was known to suffer from bouts of depression, and was reportedly infuriated by a sermon the minister had given two weeks earlier.

Shooting 
Ratzmann had left the Sheraton Hotel building 20 minutes earlier. He then returned carrying a 9mm Beretta handgun and fired 22 rounds into the Living Church of God congregation, killing the minister and six others, including the minister's son. Four others, including the minister's wife, were wounded, one critically. Ratzmann shot and killed himself midway through the second of the three magazines he had brought with him.

The incident focused national attention on the teachings and legacy of Herbert W. Armstrong, the Worldwide Church of God and LCG's leader Roderick C. Meredith and the police investigated religious issues as potential motives for the shooting, though no official conclusion has been reached.

Victims 
 Pastor Randy Gregory, 50
 James Gregory, 16
 Harold Diekmeier, 72
 Gloria Critari, 55
 Bart Oliver, 15
 Richard Reeves, 58
 Gerald Miller, 44

Aftermath 
During the police search of the house that Ratzmann shared with his mother and sister, a .22 rifle, ammunition and three computers were taken away.

The March 13 autopsy revealed that Ratzmann was suffering from Hashimoto's thyroiditis as well as a mild congenital heart abnormality, and was missing part of three fingers on his left hand, the result of a much earlier injury.

See also 
 List of homicides in Wisconsin
 List of rampage killers in the United States

References 

1960 births
2005 suicides
21st-century American criminals
American mass murderers
People from New Berlin, Wisconsin
Mass murder in 2005
2005 murders in the United States
2005 mass shootings in the United States
Murder–suicides in Wisconsin
Suicides by firearm in Wisconsin
Crimes in Wisconsin
Attacks in the United States in 2005
Mass shootings in Wisconsin
American murderers of children